The men's team pursuit at the 1960 Summer Olympics in Rome, Italy was held from 27 to 29 August 1960. There were 76 participants from 19 nations.

Competition format

The team pursuit event consisted of both a time trial (with up to 2 teams on the track at the same time) and a series of head-to-head races between 2 teams. There were a total of four rounds: an elimination round, quarterfinals, semifinals, and finals.

 Elimination round: This round was a time trial, with 1 or 2 teams on the track simultaneously. The top 8 times, regardless of heat, advanced to the head-to-head competitions.
 Quarterfinals: There were four quarterfinals. Beginning with the quarterfinals, each round featured a single head-to-head race. The winner of each advanced to the semifinals while the loser was eliminated.
 Semifinals: There two semifinals. The winner of each advanced to the gold medal final, the loser to the bronze medal final.
 Finals: A gold medal final and a bronze medal final were held.

Results

Elimination round

Quarterfinals

Quarterfinal 1

Quarterfinal 2

Quarterfinal 3

Quarterfinal 4

Semifinals

Semifinal 1

Semifinal 2

Finals

Bronze medal final

Gold medal final

Final classification

References

Cycling at the 1960 Summer Olympics
Cycling at the Summer Olympics – Men's team pursuit
Track cycling at the 1960 Summer Olympics